is a large thermal power station operated by JERA in the city of Chita, Aichi, Japan.

History
Plans to build a power station in Chita were drawn up in the early 1960s, and a site was selected on reclaimed land facing Ise Bay in the northern part of Chita Peninsula. 

Unit 1 came on line in February 1966. A total of six units were built between 1966 and 1974 to power the cities and industries of Aichi Prefecture and Nagoya Metropolis.

Units 1 through 4 were modernized and converted to burn natural gas in 1985, whereas Units 5 and 6 were designed as LNG-fired plants  from the start. From 1992–1996, Units 1, 2, 5 and 6 were shut down and were converted into combined cycle plants by adding a gas turbine to the existing boiler-steam turbine units to reuse exhaust gases. This gave the Chita Thermal Power Station a total power generating capacity of 3966 MW, making it one of the largest in Japan at the time.

Unit 1 was taken offline on March 15, 2017 followed by Unit 2 and Unit 3 on April 1, 2017 and Unit 4 on October 31, 2017. As these units have not been demolished, the JERA home page still lists the nameplate capacity of the plant as 3,966 MW. 

In April 2019, all thermal power plant operations of Chubu Electric Power were transferred to JERA, a joint venture between Chubu Electric and TEPCO Fuel & Power, Inc, a subsidiary of Tokyo Electric Power Company.

Plant details

See also 

 Energy in Japan
 List of power stations in Japan

References

External links
official home page 

Buildings and structures in Aichi Prefecture
1966 establishments in Japan
Energy infrastructure completed in 1966
Natural gas-fired power stations in Japan
Chita, Aichi
Chubu Electric Power